The 2015 Idol Star Athletics Basketball Futsal Archery Championships (Hangul: 아이돌스타 육상 농구 풋살 양궁 선수권대회) was held at Goyang Gymnasium in Goyang, South Korea and was broadcast on MBC on February 19 and 20, 2015. At the championships, a total number of 9 events (6 in athletics and in archery, futsal, basketball 1 each) were contested: 5 by men and 4 by women. There were around 200 K-pop singers and celebrities who participated, divided into 19 teams.

Cast

Main 
 Members of male K-pop groups:
 Super Junior, 2AM, Beast, Shinee, Infinite, B1A4, Exo, VIXX, Got7, BtoB, Block B, Boyfriend, Teen Top, ZE:A, Tasty, ToppDogg, A-JAX, UNIQ, C-Clow, MYNAME
 Members of female K-pop groups:
 4Minute, Kara, Sistar, Nine Muses, Girl's Day, Rainbow, AOA, Apink, Bestie, EXID, Sunmi, Lovelyz, GFriend, Wassup

Results

Men 

Athletics

Futsal

Basketball

Women 

Athletics

Archery

Ratings

References

MBC TV original programming
South Korean variety television shows
South Korean game shows
2015 in South Korean television
Idol Star Athletics Championships